The Far East University (FEU) is a private university in Sinshih District, Tainan, Taiwan. The University provides 4 Colleges, 20 Faculty and 6 research institutes, enrolled around ten thousand students.

FEU offers a wide range of undergraduate and graduate programs across seven colleges: College of Humanities, College of Social Sciences, College of Management, College of Foreign Languages, College of Information and Engineering, College of Nursing, and College of Medicine. 

The university also offers a number of interdisciplinary programs, including the International Master of Business Administration (IMBA) program, which is taught entirely in English.

History
FEU was established in 1968 as the Far East Junior College of Technology. In August 1999, the school was promoted and officially renamed Far East College with Nai-chang Wang serving as president. To comply with the promotion and to help students develop wholesome character, the Humanities Education Center of Far East College was established. In August 2006, the college was granted university status and the name was changed to Far East University. In 2020, the university had an enrollment rate of less than 60%.

Faculties
 College of Engineering
 College of Hospitality and Leisure
 College of Management and Design

Transportation
The university is accessible within walking distance South East from Xinshi Station of the Taiwan Railways.

See also
 List of universities in Taiwan

References

1968 establishments in Taiwan
Educational institutions established in 1968
Private universities and colleges in Taiwan
Universities and colleges in Tainan
Universities and colleges in Taiwan
Technical universities and colleges in Taiwan